Heyi Pictures is a Chinese film production company owned by Youku Tudou.

Filmography

References

Alibaba Group
Film production companies of China